AS Ponténégrine is a Congolese football club based in Republic of the Congo. They play in the Congo Premier League.

Stadium
Currently the team plays at the 13500 capacity Stade Municipal de Pointe-Noire.

Football clubs in the Republic of the Congo
Pointe-Noire